Winslow Township is located in Stephenson County, Illinois. As of the 2010 census, its population was 633 and it contained 283 housing units. The village of Winslow is located in the township.

Geography
Winslow is Township 29 North, Range 5 (part) and 6 East of the Fourth Principal Meridian.

Demographics

References

External links
City-data.com.
Stephenson County Official Site.

Townships in Stephenson County, Illinois
Townships in Illinois